The 23rd National Film Awards, presented by Directorate of Film Festivals, the organisation set up by Ministry of Information and Broadcasting, India to felicitate the best of Indian Cinema released in the year 1975.

At 23rd National Film Awards, two new awards were introduced for the short films category for Best News Review and Best Newsreel Cameraman. These newly introduced awards includes Rajat Kamal (Silver Lotus) and a Certificate. Over the years, these two awards are discontinued.

Awards 

Awards were divided into feature films and non-feature films.

Awards were also renamed with 23rd National Film Awards. President's Gold Medal for the All India Best Feature Film renamed to National Film Award for Best Feature Film, whereas President's Gold Medal for the Best Documentary Film is to National Film Award for Best Non-Feature Film. For children's films, Prime Minister's Gold Medal is renamed as National Film Award for Best Children's Film. At the regional level, President's Silver Medal for Best Feature Film is renamed as National Film Award for Best Feature Film in a particular language.

Lifetime Achievement Award

Feature films 

Feature films were awarded at All India as well as regional level. For 23rd National Film Awards, a Kannada film, Chomana Dudi won the President's Gold Medal for the All India Best Feature Film also winning the maximum number of awards (three) with the Tamil film Apoorva Raagangal. Following were the awards given in each category:

All India Award 

Following were the awards given:

Regional Award 

The awards were given to the best films made in the regional languages of India. For feature films in English, Gujarati, Kashmiri, Meitei, Oriya and Punjabi, President's Silver Medal for Best Feature Film was not given.

All the awardees are awarded with 'Silver Lotus Award (Rajat Kamal)', a certificate and cash prize. The producer and director of the film were awarded with 10,000 and 5,000, respectively.

Non-Feature films 

For 23rd National Film Awards, two new awards were introduced for the short films category for Best News Review and Best Newsreel Cameraman. These newly introduced awards includes Rajat Kamal (Silver Lotus) and a Certificate. Over the years, these two awards are discontinued.

Short films

Awards not given 

Following were the awards not given as no film was found to be suitable for the award:

 Best Film on Family Welfare
 Best Children's Film
 Best Lyrics
 Best Feature Film on National Integration
 Best Child Artist
 Best Screenplay
 President's Silver Medal for Best Feature Film in English
 President's Silver Medal for Best Feature Film in Manipuri
 President's Silver Medal for Best Feature Film in Oriya
 President's Silver Medal for Best Feature Film in Punjabi

References

External links 
 National Film Awards Archives
 Official Page for Directorate of Film Festivals, India

National Film Awards (India) ceremonies
1975 film awards
1975 in Indian cinema